Sion is an ancient city in the Roman province of Asia Prima, in Asia Minor.

Ecclesiastical history 
Sion was a bishopric, suffragan of the Metropolitan of the provincial capital Ephesus. It nominally restored as a Roman Catholic titular bishopric and promoted to titular archbishopric in 1950.

References

External links 
 GigaCatholic, with titular incumbent biography links

Catholic titular sees in Asia